Avdulovo-1 is a rural locality (a selo) in Leontyevskoye Rural Settlement of Stupinsky District, Moscow Oblast, Russia. The population was 11 as of 2010. There is 1 street.

Geography 
The village is located on the left bank of the Sukusha River, 34 km northeast of Stupino (the district's administrative centre) by road. Avdulovo-2 is the nearest rural locality.

References 

Rural localities in Stupinsky District